Bremen is an unincorporated community in Randolph County, Illinois, United States.

History
A post office called Bremen was established in 1856, and remained in operation until being discontinued in 1906. The community was named after Bremen, Germany.

References

Unincorporated communities in Randolph County, Illinois
Unincorporated communities in Illinois